The Sivalayams are 12 Saivite shrines in Kanyakumari district of Tamil Nadu, India. On the day of Sivarathri, the devotees go on a marathon from Thirumalai, the first Sivalayam, to the last, Thirunattalam.

The Sivalayam Temples are
 Thirumalai 
 Thikkurichi
 Thiruparappu
 Thirunanthikkarai
 Ponmanai 
 Pannippagam
 Kallkkulam
 Melancode
 Thiruvidaicode
 Thiruvithamkode
 Thiruppanticode
 Thirunattalam

External links 
 a guide about the 12 Siyalayams

Kanyakumari
Hindu temples in Kanyakumari district
Lists of Hindu temples